Namseonghyeon station is a railway station on the Gyeongbu Line in South Korea.

External links
 Station information from Korail

Railway stations in North Gyeongsang Province
Cheongdo County
Railway stations opened in 1919